Joe Stegner (born December 17, 1949, in Clarkston, Washington) moved to Lewiston, Idaho and was a Republican member of the Idaho Senate from 1998 to 2011, representing the 7th District. He is now a lobbyist for the University of Idaho. He is married to Deborah Stegner and is a father to four children.

Early life and career 
Stegner attended University of Idaho and received his bachelor's degree.  He was owner of Stegner Grain and Seed Company from 1972 to 1995.  He is a property manager.  In the Idaho State Senate, Stegner served as Assistant Majority Leader.

Organizations 
Stegner has been a member of:
 President of Agricultural Consulting Council of University of Idaho
 Tri-State Agricultural Research Council
 Pacific Northwest Grain and Feed Association.
 Director of Lewiston Chamber of Commerce
 President of Idaho Feed and Grain Association
 Board Member of Research Foundation of University of Idaho
 President of North Idaho Foundation Seed Association
 Board Member of Lewis-Clark State College Foundation
 Activity Center Fundraising Committee at Lewis-Clark State College
 Clarkston Chamber of Commerce.

References

External links 
 Joe Stegner at joestegmer.org
 Joe Steger ag votesmart.org
 Joe Stegner at legislature.idaho.gov

1949 births
Living people
Republican Party Idaho state senators
People from Clarkston, Washington
People from Lewiston, Idaho
University of Idaho alumni